Martín Garrido Mayorga (born November 9, 1974 in Córdoba, Argentina) is an Argentine former professional road racing cyclist.

Major results 

1999
 2nd Overall Vuelta a Venezuela
1st Stage 9
2000
 1st Stage 1 Vuelta a Galega
2001
 1st Stage 3 Vuelta a Murcia
2004
 1st Stage 3 GP Barbot
 1st Stage 3 Volta ao Algarve
2005
 Tour of Bulgaria
1st Stages 3, 4, 8 & 9
 1st Prologue Tour de Normandie
2006
 1st Stage 6 Tour of Bulgaria
 1st Stage 3 Volta a Portugal
2007
 1st Prologue Volta a Portugal
 1st Stage 3 Volta ao Distrito de Santarém
2008
 1st Overall Tour de San Luis
1st Prologue & Stage 3
 1st Overall Vuelta del Este Córdobes
 1st Stage 3 Boucles de la Mayenne

External links

Profile

1974 births
Living people
Argentine male cyclists
Sportspeople from Córdoba, Argentina
Vuelta a Venezuela stage winners